The 1943 Hamilton by-election was held on 29 January 1943.  The by-election was held due to the death of the incumbent Labour MP, Duncan Graham.  It was won by the Labour candidate Thomas Fraser.

References

1943 in Scotland
1940s elections in Scotland
Politics of South Lanarkshire
1943 elections in the United Kingdom
By-elections to the Parliament of the United Kingdom in Scottish constituencies